George Kerr (1849 – 1913) was an Ontario merchant and political figure. He represented Stormont in the Legislative Assembly of Ontario as a Conservative member from 1905 to 1908.

He was born in County Fermanagh, Ireland in 1849, the son of William Kerr, and came to Farran's Point to join his brother Joseph in business. In 1872, he married Margery Ann Sutherland. Kerr served as reeve for Osnabruck Township for fourteen years and also served as warden for Stormont, Dundas and Glengarry counties in 1890.

External links 

Stormont, Dundas and Glengarry : a history, 1784-1945, JG Harkness (1946)

1849 births
1913 deaths
Irish emigrants to Canada
People from County Fermanagh
People from the United Counties of Stormont, Dundas and Glengarry
Progressive Conservative Party of Ontario MPPs